{{DISPLAYTITLE:C21H22O12}}
The molecular formula C21H22O12 (molar mass: 466.39 g/mol, exact mass: 466.1111 u) may refer to:

 Xeractinol

Molecular formulas